Curie is a private subsea communications cable owned by Google, connecting the United States to Chile and Panama. First commissioned in 2018 and completed in 2019, Curie is Google's third fully-owned subsea cable, and Chile's first subsea cable in nearly two decades.

References

Submarine cables
2020 establishments in Chile
2020 establishments in Panama
2020 establishments in California